Djurs Sommerland is an amusement park located in Djursland, Denmark, just north of the village of Nimtofte, 23 kilometers west of Grenaa, and 36 kilometers east of Randers.

The park opened in 1981, and it has progressively expanded every year since then.
Its guests mostly consist of families, as most of the rides are aimed at kids and teenagers. Because of this, the park has been very adaptive in making rides accessible for most heights and ages.
The park is, as suggested in the name, predominantly open in the summer, with the recent addition of special Halloween opening days in October. The season begins around May and lasts until mid-October. Djurs Sommerland has had around 800,000 annual visitors in recent years, making the park the fifth largest tourist attraction in Denmark.

History
Djurs Sommerland was established by the hotelier Børge Godsk Jensen and music agent Ole B. Nielsen. They chose the popular vacation spot of Jylland as location for the park. The park has grown in popularity over the years and has added many rides since opening. The park is now operated by Nielsen's sons Henrik and Michael.

A new attraction, Piraten, was opened in 2008. It held the title of fastest roller coaster in Denmark until 2022 when a coaster in Fårup Sommerland named "Falken" took the record for height and speed.
This changed a lot of press for the park as it got massive media attention and made Djurs Sommerland a must visit destination for turists.
Immediately after opening, the coaster was chosen as the fifth best roller coaster in the world.

The current CEO of the park is Henrik B. Nielsen.

The park
The park is divided into 8 areas; all are included in the admission price:

Sommerland is the park's original area that opened in 1981; over the years many of its rides have been removed while others have been added. The main attractions are: Ørnen and Colorado River.
Bondegårdsland is the new area with 10 new rides themed after life at a farm. The rides are for the whole family including the smallest children.
Afrikaland was opened in 1993 and is closing in 2023. Here, the intrepid traveller can venture on an adventurous journey on a river surrounded by a jungle that is meant to resemble Africa. 
Westernland has a replica of an old Texas Wild West town where cowboys roam the streets; there is also a play area where kids can play Indians. The main attraction in this land is the Rio Grande Rafting.
Mexicoland has a miniature golf course. The main attraction is the double-launch coaster Juvelen.
Piratland opened in 2008. It has a pirate theme and three of the park's most exciting rides: Piraten, Skatteøen and The Piranha flume ride.
Vandland is a water park that opened in 1986 and was the first of its kind in Denmark at the time.
Vikingeland a small area in the further back of the park with a few kiddie rides and one Gerstlauer coaster named Thor's Hammer.
Dinosaurland opened 2022 and is the newest addition to the park and is planned to replace the "Afrikaland" section in 2023.

Roller coasters

Water rides
Colorado River - a log flume ride that opened in 1991, located in Sommerland. A themed river adventure on a 370 meter long course that has 3 drops the highest of which is 11 meters tall. Interlink.
Piratfisken - a log flume ride that opened in 2009, located in Piratland. A family-style ride that is 150 meters long and ends in a 5 meter tall drop. ABC Rides.
Rio Grande Rafting - river rapids ride that opened in 1998, located in Westernland. A 6-passenger raft that travels a 500 m long course with a tunnel, water effects and an Indian village on the way. Interlink.

Thrill Rides
Tigeren - a pendulum swing ride.
SpinOsaurus - a Disk'O modul swing on a track.

Family rides
Andedammen - join the duck family for a relaxing tour around the pond.
Bondegårdskarrusellen - join all the animals of the farm in this merry-go-round.
Buffalo Bumper Cars - bumper cars that opened in 2012 in Westernland. Bertazzon.
Den Vilde Hønsejagt - chase the hens with the fox in a roller coaster.
Det Gamle Vandtårn - a 12-meter high tower with a free fall.
Det Nye Vandtårn - help the farmer check if the new tower has been painted before the free fall.
Det Skøre Kompas - Rockin' Tug Kontiki in Piratland. Zierer.
Djurs Expressen - railroad journey in Sommerland.
Drageskibet - pirate ship ride in Vikingeland.
Edderkoppenettet - climbing zone of ropes in Sommerland.
Family bicycles - bicycling course in Sommerland.
Frøerne - jump along with crazy frogs.
Gold-diggers - pan for gold in Westernland.
Junglesti - obstacle zone in Afrikaland.
Fossilvaskeren - spinning cups in Dinosaurland. Mack Rides.
Klatrebjerget - climbing mountain and slide in Sommarland.
Kornmøllen - ride the bikes and help the farmer grind his harvest.
Milkshakeren - join the cows in the barn on this spinning and shaken ride, where milk is turned into milkshake.
Mexicana Golf - mini golf in Mexicoland.
Motorbike Derby - Spinning flat ride that has guests control the uplift and speed of the experience.
Piratlegeplads - play zone themed on a pirate ship in Piratland.
Rodeotyrene - the bulls are chasing each other as they have bullseyes painted on their behind.
Safaribussen - flat ride located in Sommerland.
Solguden - flying fish ride with an Aztec theme that opened in 2012 in Mexicoland. Zierer.
Søulken - is a Polyp model with unlocked cart rotation.
Speedy Gonzales - water dinghy ride in Mexicoland. Metallbau Emmeln.
Traktorerne - a ride in your own tractor in farmland.
Water bikes and canoes - canoes / pedal boats on a lake in Sommerland. Must be 1.2 m tall to sail alone in the canoes.
Wild West Karrusellen - wave swinger that opened in 2005 in Westernland. Zierer.
Vikingetårnene - Mini manuel observation tower ride in Vikingeland.

Kiddie rides
Bouncy cushions - bouncy castles in Sommerland.
Indianerland - play area with an Indian theme in Westernland.
Mini Buffalo Bumper Cars - kiddie bumper cars that opened in 2012 in Westernland. Bertazzon.
Pony Ekspressen - ride a mechanic horse on a track in Westernland.
Sablen - an 11 m-tall tilt tower that opened in 2010 in Piratland. ABC Rides.
Shooting Range - test your skills at shooting in Westernland.
Soap bubbles - make your own soap bubbles in Westernland.
Texas Town - playground for kids in Westernland.
Trampolines - trampolines in Sommerland.
Tunnel Slide - slides for the youngest kids in Sommerland.

Vandland
The water park Vandland opened in 1985 and is included in the admission price.
Black Hole - enclosed tube ride; height limit 1.2 m.
Hawaii - interactive play area for kids.
Honolulu Bay - wave pool.
Junior Aqua Park - play area for kids.
Waikiki Surf School - six side by side slides.
Water Slides - water slides; height limit 90 cm.
The Wave - two-person tube halfpipe; height limit 1.4 m.
Wild River - raging river tube ride; height limit none / 1.4 m alone.

Other
Magical Halloween in October.

References

External links 

 Djurs Sommerland homepage

Amusement parks in Denmark
Tourist attractions in the Central Denmark Region
1981 establishments in Denmark
Amusement parks opened in 1981